Aliabad is one of the old suburbs in Hyderabad, India. It is part of the old city of Hyderabad. Aliabad is situated about 2.5 km from the historic Charminar towards Falaknuma palace.

History 
The Aliabad Darwaza was one of the thirteen gates to the city wall of Hyderabad. It was adjoined by the Aliabad Sarai, a resthouse for travelers to spend the night.

Public transport
Aliabad is connected by buses run by TSRTC, since a bus depot is close by, it is well connected. Buses that run are 65 and 9.

The closest MMTS train station is at Uppuguda which is a kilometer away.

References

Neighbourhoods in Hyderabad, India